Hamakita may refer to:

Hamakita, Shizuoka, a former municipality in Japan
Hamakita Station, a railway station in Hamakita-ku, Hamamatsu, Shizuoka Prefecture, Japan
Hamakita Ward, the ward of Hamamatsu of which it became a part

See also
Hamaki
Hamakita Hiryu Festival, festival in Hamamatsu held in honor of Ryujin, the god believed to be associated with the Tenryū River, and features a wide variety of events such as the Hamakita takoage (kite flying) event and the Hiryu himatsuri (flying dragon fire festival) which celebrates water, sound, and flame.